ATSX (All Terrain Skate Cross Federation) is the organization that sanctions ice cross downhill competitions since 2019.  Previous events were known as Red Bull Crashed Ice.

Races

ATSX1000 

The ATSX 1000 offers the highest international competition level. Access to an ATSX 1000 competition is restricted. Only competitors in accordance with the 201 Limitation of participation at ATSX 1000 rule will be invited to take part in an ATSX 1000 race. An ATSX 1000 race shall host a competition for all categories (Men, Women, Junior). The ATSX 1000 races allow competitors to earn points to the World Ranking and the World Championship.

Points obtained at an ATSX 1000 race range from 1000pts for the 1st place and down to 2.375pts for the 200th place. The points will be tallied and shall be added to the World Ranking update of the ATSX World Ranking.

ATSX500 and ATSX250 
ATSX 500 and 250 races were formally known as Riders Cup races, and are worth 500 and 250 points respectively. With its establishment, ATSX 1000 competitors must qualify through racing in ATSX 500 and ATSX 250 races.

Points obtained at an ATSX 500 race range from 500pts for the 1st place and down to 2.375pts for the 200th place.

Points obtained at an ATSX 250 race range from 250pts for the 1st place and get down to 1.1875pts for the 200th place.

ATSX100 
The ATSX 100 level generally corresponds to the National Championship level races. The National Championship races allow competitors to earn points solely to the World Ranking. competitors of all nationalities are invited to participate in a National Championship race. The National Championship hosting organization can decide to set an independent National ranking involving only their National competitors. In this case, it needs to be done under the supervision of the respective National Federation with the approbation of the ATSX.

Points obtained at an ATSX 100 race range from 100pts for the 1st place and down to 0.475pts for the 200th place. Athlete can participate in many ATSX100 races however, only the best result from the competitor's ATSX100 races will remain in the competitor's World Ranking points calculation.

The ATSX World Championship 
The points earned at ATSX 1000, ATSX 500 and ATSX 250 races of the same season will be compiled to crown the Man and Woman World Champion. The Ice Cross World Championship overall points calculation will consider throw out results. Therefore, a certain number of races in each competition level will count in the final World Championship points calculation as follows:

If two races of the same tiers are held the same weekend, that will count for one race in the total number of races in the season calculation.

Results 
In 2019/2020 the first season under the new name was held.

2019–2020

2022–2023

Registrations 
All athletes who want to take part in an ATSX 1000 event must register for every race or competition on www.ATSX.org. Registration will open 17 days and will close 10 days prior to each ATSX 1000 Time Trial event at 18.00 UTC. Entries made after the posted deadline will not be considered in any case. Registration deadline to ATSX 250 and ATSX 500 will close 4 days prior each race or before should maximum participation capacity (outlined by the race organizer) be reached, following a 1st come, 1st served basis.

Notable competitors

Women

References

Ice skating organizations